Tom Savage (1940/41 – 30 March 2017) was a director of The Communications Clinic.

Early years

Tom Savage entered Maynooth in 1959 earning degrees in divinity and arts, before further studies at QUB. After graduating from Queens in 1968, he became Director of Social Welfare in the Archdiocese of Armagh, a post he held until 1972. Also in 1972, William Cardinal Conway appointed him to the Independent Broadcasting Authority (IBA).  During the Troubles, he was the priest sent by Cardinal Conway to welcome the British troops – then seen as peacekeepers – into Northern Ireland.

In 1972, he was seconded to the Catholic Communications Institute at the request of Bunny Carr, the then Director of the Catholic Communications Centre in Booterstown, Dublin, where he became a lecturer. During those years, he was a regular presenter of the End the Day religious programme on UTV and of Outlook on RTÉ TV.

Tom Savage lectured in the Sociology of Media and Central and Local Government in the School of Journalism in Rathmines and was a third level external examiner for the then VECs in Athlone and Carlow. He was the first Health Promotion Officer of the then Health Education Bureau.

Communications career
He joined Bunny Carr's company, Carr Communications, in the mid-1970s. He delivered consultancy and management training in Britain, the US, Canada, Greece, France, Italy, Spain and Portugal. He was Communications Advisor to former Taoiseach Albert Reynolds. He resigned from the company in 2008.

His textbook on negotiations, "How to Get What you Want", was published in 1999.

RTÉ career
He worked in RTÉ Radio as a night news editor and in its features department. He presented RTÉ television shows It Says in the Papers, Eyewitness to History, and For Better or For Worse. He was appointed Chairman of the RTÉ Board on 23 February 2009.

Personal life
He was a Roman Catholic priest. Savage was married to Terry Prone, also a co-owner of The Communications Clinic. Their son, Anton Savage, was an Irish radio presenter on Today FM.

He was a lifelong member of Cooley Kickham GAA club in County Louth, played senior football for the county and won an all Ireland junior medal in 1961. He also was a member of the first Queens University GAA team to win the Sigerson cup.

References

1940s births
Date of birth missing
2017 deaths
Alumni of Queen's University Belfast
Alumni of St Patrick's College, Maynooth
Irish public relations people
RTÉ executives
RTÉ television presenters
20th-century Irish Roman Catholic priests